Citibank Russia is a Russian commercial bank, which is part of the financial corporation Citigroup.

Recent announcements on reducing operations in Russia 
In April 2021, Citi announced its plan to exit Russia consumer banking as part of its global strategic refresh to exit consumer franchises in 14 markets. In March 2022, Citi decided to expand the scope of that exit to include Commercial Banking (CCB) .  

On August 25, 2022, Citi announced that as part of its continued efforts to reduce its operations and exposure in Russia, it will wind down its consumer banking and local CCB operations in the country.  

On October 28th, 2022, Citi also announced that AO Citibank agreed to sell a portfolio of ruble-denominated personal installment loans to Uralsib, a Russian commercial bank. Citi also agreed to transfer to Uralsib a portfolio of ruble-denominated credit card balances, subject to customer consents. On December 12th, 2022, the rights of the consumer loans of AO Citibank were transferred to Uralsib.

On October 14th 2022, Citi announced that it would be discontinuing nearly all the institutional banking services offered in Russia by the end of March 2023. After that Citi’s only operations in Russia will be those necessary to fulfill its remaining legal and regulatory obligations.

See also
List of banks in Russia

References

External links
Citibank Russia Website

Citigroup